Joe Farrell was an American jazz multi-instrumentalist.

Joe Farrell may also refer to:

Joe Farrell (baseball) (1857–1893), American baseball player
Joe Farrell (soccer) (born 1994), American soccer player
Joe Farrell (visual effects artist), Australian visual effects artist
Joe Farrell, drummer on the album Folk-Lore

See also
Joseph Farrell (disambiguation)